David McMullen is an Australian socialist economist who contends that global economic development in the 21st century will provide the necessary material basis for a classless post-capitalist society. He expects affluence rather than poverty to become the rule by the end of this period given that it would not require unusually high growth rates, and resource and environmental constraints will be overcome by advances in technology. With a high level of economic development, equality would no longer entail sharing poverty and lengthy toil, the main reason for classes and inequality in the past. These views are expounded in his book Bright Future: Abundance and Progress in the 21st Century.

Global affluence 
McMullen expects that most regions will undergo considerable economic growth while more and more countries, and an increasing proportion of the world's population, will join the developed camp. He believes that the energy and mineral resources that can be harnessed with present and future technologies will more than meet our needs indefinitely. These include a sixfold increase in energy output by the end of the century to bring 9 to 10 billion people up to present developed world levels of consumption. Furthermore, we will produce all the food we need through the better harnessing of land and water and improved plant and animal breeding. He also believes that our impact on the environment can be kept within manageable limits, with economic development and better technology being the only solution to air and water pollution and threats to flora and fauna.

Improving basis for a post-capitalist society 
McMullen contrasts the 21st century prospects for post-capitalist society with the virtually impossible conditions in backward regions such as Russia and China during their 20th century revolutions. The more developed countries are already entering the realm of the possible as average incomes approach a level that provides considerable material comfort and most work takes on a more congenial nature.  Work tasks as a whole are becoming more interesting and challenging and the more routine ones are losing their worst aspects. These better material conditions plus the changed social environment to be expected from the new system would make work motivation without material reward quite plausible.

In McMullen's view, the non-material underpinnings for a post-capitalist society are also advancing. Culture and education are less and less the private domain of an elite and people are generally less submissive.  So he is basically saying that irrespective of other difficulties, there are some very important underlying developments that improve the prospects of a future post-capitalist transformation.

Decentralized price system under social ownership 
McMullen also defends the social form of ownership required by a classless post-capitalist society from claims that it would be unable to effectively use a price system based on decentralized bids and offers. This argument is mainly associated with  Austrian School economists who argue that such a system requires market exchanges between enterprises.  (See Socialist Calculation Debate and Economic Calculation Problem).

McMullen believes workers in enterprises and work units, motivated by work satisfaction and the desire to contribute to an efficient and dynamic economy, would drive a better price system than one based on the profit motive. They would bid for resources on the basis of least cost alternatives and an honest expectation of demand for the resulting output. They would offer output at prices that reflect cost and ensure that products go to the highest bidders in the case of excess demand. All demand for intermediate production would be derived from the expected demand for final individual and collective consumption. Such pricing would guide both the more day-to-day decisions and longer term investment. Many of the decisions being made would be quite entrepreneurial in nature involving new products and services, new methods, and new entrants, be they existing enterprises or start-ups. Access to funding for investment could be through numerous assessment agencies that have been allocated funds for that purpose.

McMullen stresses that the use of a decentralized price system would not involve so-called "market socialism". Under social ownership, the transactions between enterprises would not be market exchanges. They would be the transfer of custody of social property not of ownership. An enterprise would not be the owner of inputs and outputs, it would be their custodian. And no individual involved with an enterprise would receive any net revenue nor incur any loss from transactions between enterprises.

He also argues that the cooperative environment would lead to a better price system because of the greater honesty,  the better flow of information due to the removal of property barriers between enterprises and the fact that income equality would remove the equity concerns currently associated with reliance on pricing.

See also
List of socialist economists
Socialization (economics)

External links
 The Economic Case for Social Ownership
 Bright Future: Abundance and Progress in the 21st Century
 Re-Opening the Debates on Economic Calculation and Motivation under Socialism

Australian economists
Living people
Year of birth missing (living people)